Hayden Pickard (born 23 August 2005) is an English professional footballer who plays as a defender for  club Barnsley.

Career
Pickard was named as Barnsley's Academy Player of the Season for the 2020–21 campaign. He made his first-team debut on 20 September 2022, coming on for Ziyad Larkeche as an 89th-minute substitute in a 2–0 win over Newcastle United U21 in an EFL Trophy group stage game at Oakwell.

Career statistics

References

2005 births
Living people
English footballers
Association football defenders
Barnsley F.C. players
English Football League players